Xiaomi Redmi 2 is a smartphone produced by Xiaomi released in January 2015. It is the successor to the Xiaomi Redmi 1 family.

Specifications

Software 
The Redmi 2/Prime comes preinstalled with Android 4.4 KitKat with the proprietary MIUI 6 custom graphical user interface, it can be upgraded to MIUI 9 based on Android 4.4 KitKat(for Redmi 2) and Android 5.1 Lollipop(for Redmi 2 Prime) via OTA. The Redmi 2 comes with a factory-unlocked bootloader, allowing users to "root" the device and install custom firmware.

The software-development community has released custom ROMs and kernels for the phone, even though the official kernel sources from Xiaomi were only released a year after launch. The Redmi 2 has achieved unofficial stable builds of CyanogenMod 11 (based on Android 4.4), 12.1 (Android 5.1) and official nightly builds of CyanogenMod 13.0 (Android 6.0.1) and CyanogenMod 14.1 (Android 7.1.1). Development of the latter version is continued in the LineageOS project after CyanogenMod's discontinuation. From LineageOS builds Redmi 2 is currently getting official nightly builds of LineageOS 17.1 (Based on Android 10). Redmi 2 has also achieved official stable builds of Resurrection Remix (based on Android 7.1.2, Android 8.1), official nightly builds of AOKP (based on Android 8.1), official stable builds of MoKee 6 (based on Android 6.0.1), MoKee 7 (based on Android 7.1.2), MoKee 8 (based on Android 8.1), official nightly builds of MoKee 9 (based on Android 9.0.0) and official builds of Mokee 10 (based on Android 10).

Hardware 
The Redmi 2 is powered by a 1.2 GHz Snapdragon 410 SoC with Adreno 306 graphics engine. It features 1 GB of RAM and 8 GB of storage. The Redmi 2S, also called Redmi 2 Enhanced or Prime (depending on locale), has 2GB of RAM and 16GB of storage. The display is a 4.7 inch IPS panel with touch capabilities, 1280x720 resolution at a density of 312 ppi with scratch-resistant AGC Dragontrail glass.

Parts Provider
Processor: Qualcomm
Modem: Qualcomm
PMIC: Qualcomm
Wifi/Bluetooth: Qualcomm
Connectivity: Qualcomm
Audio: Qualcomm
RAM: Samsung, Micron, Elpida
Storage: Samsung, Micron, Toshiba
Display panel: Sharp, AUO, BOE, EBBG
Touch: Focaltech, Atmel
Camera: Samsung, OmniVision
Battery: Coslight, Sunwoda

Variants 
Redmi 2 has been updated with two models, namely Redmi 2 Prime (India) and Redmi 2 Enhanced (China), with 2 GB of RAM and 16 GB of storage, twice that of the standard model.

There are several variants of the standard and upgraded model for different markets, with varying baseband support.

Successor 

The Xiaomi Redmi 3 was announced in January 2016.

References

Android (operating system) devices
Mobile phones introduced in 2015
2
Discontinued smartphones
Mobile phones with user-replaceable battery